This is a list of governors of Tamaulipas since it became a state of Mexico in 1822, it includes the list of governors of Nuevo Santander (New Santander) the name of the Spanish province in northeast New Spain before the Mexican War of Independence, which included present-day Tamaulipas and South Texas.

Nuevo Santander

State of Tamaulipas

The Governor is elected to a six-year term and may only hold the title once. This term begins on February 5 of the year before a presidential election and finishes on February 4 after a period of six years.

To be a candidate for Governor, one must be a Mexican citizen by birth, at least 30 years of age, and a native or resident of Tamaulipas for at least 5 years prior to the election.

Independence to Revolution

Constitution of 1917

References

See also
 List of Mexican state governors

Tamaulipas
1822 establishments in Mexico